Dora Krstulović (born 19 June 1981) is a former professional tennis player from Croatia.

Biography
Born in Split, Krstulović is the daughter of basketball player Duje Krstulović, who won a gold medal as a member of the Yugoslavian team at the 1980 Moscow Olympics. As a junior she trained under Nick Bollettieri at the Bradenton Academy in Florida. 

Krstulović, a right-handed player, made her only WTA Tour main draw appearance at the 1998 Croatian Bol Ladies Open, as a wildcard entrant. She also featured in the doubles match of a Fed Cup tie for Croatia in 1998, a World Group II quarter-final against Japan, in which she and partner Jelena Kostanic were beaten in the dead rubber by Rika Hiraki and Nana Miyagi. She finished up on tour in 1999 while still competing as a junior, reaching the French Open girls' doubles semi-finals that year with Laura Dell'Angelo, then played collegiate tennis in the United States at Arizona State University.

ITF finals

Singles: 1 (0-1)

References

External links
 
 
 

1981 births
Living people
Croatian female tennis players
Arizona State Sun Devils women's tennis players
Tennis players from Split, Croatia